Libero Lorenz "Bert" Bertagnolli (November 13, 1914 – September 14, 1992) was an American football player and coach. He played college football at Washington University in St. Louis and professionally in the National Football League (NFL) with the Chicago Bears, in 1942 and 1945. Bertagnolli was the head football coach at Illinois Wesleyan University in Bloomington, Illinois from 1951 to 1953, compiling a record of 11–12–2. He served in the United States Navy during World War II. Bertagnolli later coached football, swimming, and tennis, at Bloomington High School in Bloomington, Illinois. He died on September 14, 1992, at BroMenn Regional Medical Center, in Bloomington, Illinois.

Head coaching record

College

References

External links
 

1914 births
1992 deaths
American football guards
Chicago Cardinals players
Great Lakes Navy Bluejackets football players
Illinois Wesleyan Titans football coaches
Washington University Bears football players
High school football coaches in Illinois
High school swimming coaches in the United States
United States Navy personnel of World War II
People from Macoupin County, Illinois
Coaches of American football from Illinois
Players of American football from Illinois